Plumbaginaceae is a family of flowering plants, with a cosmopolitan distribution. The family is sometimes referred to as the leadwort family or the plumbago family.

Most species in this family are perennial herbaceous plants, but a few grow as lianas or shrubs.  The plants have perfect flowers and are pollinated by insects.  They are found in many different climatic regions, from arctic to tropical conditions, but are particularly associated with salt-rich steppes, marshes, and sea coasts.

The family has been recognized by most taxonomists. The APG II system (2003; unchanged from the APG system of 1998), recognizes this family and assigns it to the order Caryophyllales in the clade core eudicots. It includes ca 30 genera and about 725 species.

The 1981 Cronquist system placed the family in a separate order Plumbaginales, which included no other families. The Dahlgren system had segregated some of these plants as family Limoniaceae.

Genera
Acantholimon
Aegialitis
Afrolimon
Armeria, the thrifts or seapinks
Bamiana
Bukiniczia
Cephalorhizum
Ceratolimon
Ceratostigma, the leadworts
Chaetolimon
Dictyolimon
Dyerophytum
Eremolimon
Ghaznianthus
Goniolimon
Ikonnikovia
Limoniastrum
Limoniopsis
Limonium (syn. Statice), the sealavenders
Muellerolimon
Neogontscharovia
Plumbagella
Plumbago, the leadworts or plumbagos
Popoviolimon
Psylliostachys
Saharanthus
Vassilczenkoa

Cultivation and uses
Chalk glands are found in this family. The family includes a number of popular garden species, which are grown for their attractive flowers.

References

External links

Plumbaginaceae in Topwalks
links at CSDL, Texas

 
Caryophyllales families